Transformers: Revenge of the Fallen – The Album is a compilation album of various artists' music from the 2009 live-action Transformers: Revenge of the Fallen. The official single is "New Divide" by Linkin Park. It was rumored that Dead by Sunrise would be releasing a track called "Crawl Back In" for the soundtrack. However, Chester Bennington said he decided not to include it. Similarly, Tyrese Gibson, who plays Sgt. Epps in the movie, said that he would be in a duet track with Jewel (produced by Babyface), titled "Make It Last", which he had hoped would appear in the film's soundtrack, but ultimately did not. The album charted at #7 on the US Billboard 200 album chart.

Track listing

Not included in the Soundtrack

Charts

Weekly charts

Year-end charts

Release history

References

Revenge of the Fallen – The Album
2009 soundtrack albums
2000s film soundtrack albums